Mahkamov is a surname. Notable people with the surname include:

Abduazizov Mahkamov (born 1987), Tajikistani footballer
Diyor Mahkamov (born 1987), Uzbek singer and actor
Otabek Mahkamov (born 1984), Uzbekistani actor, lawyer, and internet personality
Qahhor Mahkamov (1932–2016), Tajikistani politician and President of Tajikistan